Lucky Onyebuchi Opara (born 9 December 1999) is a Nigerian professional footballer who plays as a left-back for USL League One club Northern Colorado Hailstorm.

Club career
Opara began his professional career in Latvia with Spartaks Jūrmala, before joining FC Lugano on loan on 22 January 2021. Opara made his professional debut with FC Lugano in a 3-0 Swiss Super League win over FC Sion on 4 March 2021.

On 13 July 2021, he joined Oulu in Finland on loan.

On 2 February 2023, Opara signed with USL League One side Northern Colorado Hailstorm.

References

External links
 
 SFL Profile

1999 births
Living people
Nigerian footballers
Association football fullbacks
FK Spartaks Jūrmala players
FC Lugano players
AC Oulu players
Northern Colorado Hailstorm FC players
Latvian Higher League players
Swiss Super League players
Veikkausliiga players
Nigerian expatriate footballers
Expatriate footballers in Latvia
Nigerian expatriate sportspeople in Latvia
Expatriate footballers in Switzerland
Nigerian expatriate sportspeople in Switzerland
Expatriate footballers in Finland
Nigerian expatriate sportspeople in Finland
Nigerian expatriate sportspeople in the United States
Expatriate soccer players in the United States